The Our Lady of Graces Cathedral also called simply Cathedral of Koupéla is a religious building belonging to the Roman Catholic Church and is located in Koupéla in the department of Koupéla, the second most populous province of Kouritenga in the African country of Burkina Faso.

There the headquarters of the Metropolitan Archdiocese of Koupéla (Archidiocèse de Koupéla  or in Latin: Archidioecesis Kupelaënsis) works,
the Metropolitan See for the Ecclesiastical Province of Koupéla, which was created in 2000 by bula  In omnes Ecclesias  of the Pope John Paul II.

See also
Roman Catholicism in Burkina Faso
Our Lady of Grace Cathedral (Nicosia)

References

Roman Catholic cathedrals in Burkina Faso
Koupéla